Flower Shops (The Album) is the second studio album by American country music singer Ernest. It was released on March 11, 2022, via Big Loud. The album contains the single "Flower Shops", a duet with Morgan Wallen.

Content
Ernest had written several songs for other artists, typically under his full name of Ernest K. Smith, prior to signing to Big Loud as a recording artist. Flower Shops (The Album) is his second release for the label, following Locals Only in 2019. He released his single "Flower Shops", a duet with Morgan Wallen, in late 2021. Big Loud announced the album's release date in early 2022, at which point they had also previewed the songs "Some Other Bar", "Feet Wanna Run", and "What It's Come To". To promote the album, Ernest performed at Nashville, Tennessee's Exit/In club in March 2022.

Track listing

Charts

References

2022 albums
Ernest (musician) albums
Big Loud albums
Albums produced by Joey Moi